Eshgaft-e Baba Mir (also Romanized as Eshgaft-e Bābā Mīr; also known as Eshkaft-e Bābā Mīr) is a village in Holayjan Rural District, in the Central District of Izeh County, Khuzestan Province, Iran. At the 2006 census, its population was 356, in 60 families.

References 

Populated places in Izeh County